Black seadevils are small, deepsea lophiiform fishes of the family Melanocetidae. The five known species (with only two given common names) are all within the genus Melanocetus. They are found in tropical to temperate waters of the Atlantic, Indian, and Pacific Oceans, with one species known only from the Ross Sea.

One of several anglerfish families, black seadevils are named for their baleful appearance and typically pitch black skin. The family name Melanocetidae may be translated from the Greek melanos meaning "black", and cetus meaning either "whale" or "sea monster". The humpback anglerfish (Melanocetus johnsonii) was featured on the August 14, 1995, issue of Time magazine, becoming something of a flagship species of deepsea fauna.

Species
The currently recognized species in this genus are:
 Melanocetus eustalus Pietsch & Van Duzer, 1980
 Melanocetus johnsonii Günther, 1864 (Humpback anglerfish)
 Melanocetus murrayi Günther, 1887 (Murray's abyssal anglerfish)
 Melanocetus niger Regan, 1925
 Melanocetus polyactis Regan, 1925
 Melanocetus rossi Balushkin & Fedorov, 1981

Physical description 

Black seadevils are characterised by a gelatinous, mostly scaleless, globose body, a large head, and generous complement of menacingly large, sharp, glassy, fang-like teeth lining the jaws of a cavernous, oblique mouth. These teeth are depressible and present only in females. Some species have a scattering of epidermal spinules on the body, and the scales (when present) are conical, hollow, and translucent. Like other anglerfishes, black seadevils possess an illicium and esca; the former being a modified dorsal spine—the "fishing rod"—and the latter being the bulbous, bioluminescent "fishing lure". The esca is simple in black seadevils (with either a conical terminus or anterior and posterior ridges in some species), and both it and the illicium are free of denticles.

The bioluminescence is produced by symbiotic bacteria; these bacteria are thought to enter the esca via an external duct (in at least two species, the esca is not luminous until this duct develops, suggesting the bacteria originate from the surrounding seawater). The bacteria, belonging to the family Vibrionaceae, are apparently different in each anglerfish species; the bacteria have yet to be cultured in vitro.

The eyes of black seadevils are small; the pupil is larger than the lens, leaving an aphakic space. Common among deepsea anglerfish is the strong sexual dimorphism in melanocetids: while females may reach a length of 18 cm (7 in) or more, males remain under 3 cm (1 in). Aside from jaw teeth, males also lack lures. Pelvic fins are absent in both sexes. All fins are rounded with slightly incised membranes; the pectoral fins are small. The single dorsal fin is positioned far back from the head, larger than and above the retrorse anal fin.

Females have large, highly distensible stomachs which give the ventral region a flabby appearance. In life, black seadevils are a dark brown to black. The skin is extremely soft and easily abraded during collection or even by simple handling.

Life history 

The Melanocetidae appear to buck the trend in deepsea anglers, in that the males—despite not feeding as an adult and thus being little more than couriers of sperm—are free-living rather than parasitic. A brief attachment to the female does probably occur, however, as evidenced by a case of mistaken identity: A male humpback anglerfish was found attached to the lip of a female horned lantern fish (Centrophryne spinulosa) of an unrelated (though also nonparasitic) family of anglerfish, Centrophrynidae. Little else is known of their reproduction: They are presumed to not be guarders, releasing buoyant eggs into the water which become part of the zooplankton.

While adults have been trawled from as deep as 3,000 m (9,900 ft), larvae appear to remain in the upper 100 m (330 ft) of the water column and gradually descend with maturity. Males likely outnumber—and mature well before—females by a wide margin.

The females use their bioluminescent "fishing poles" to lure both conspecifics and prey, which include crustaceans and small fish such as lanternfish and bristlemouths; the seadevils' highly distensible stomachs also allow them to swallow prey larger than themselves, which is an important adaptation to life in the lean depths. In contrast with males, females are poor swimmers and spend most of their time motionless, waiting for something to approach their lures. Predators of black seadevils are not well known, but include lancetfish. Bruce Robison of California Monterey Bay Aquarium Research Institute, who led the dive, spotted a Black Seadevil at 600 m (1,900 ft) during an exploration of the Monterey Canyon via a remote-operated diving vehicle on Nov. 22, 2014.

References 

 
"Review of the deep-sea anglerfishes (Lophiiformes: Ceratioidei) of southern Africa". M. Eric Anderson and Robin W. Leslie. February 2005 version. J.L.B. Smith Institute of Ichthyology.
"Marine microlights: the luminous marine bacteria". Peter Herring. February 2005 version. Microbiology Today, Vol. 29., November 2002.
Pietsch, T. W. 2009. Oceanic Anglerfishes: Extraordinary Diversity in the Deep Sea, University of California Press.

External link

Melanocetidae
Deep sea fish
Taxa named by Albert Günther